Moscow to California is a single by DJ M.E.G., featuring Sergey Lazarev and Timati.

It was premiered 6 February 2012 via the Web site of the Russian Billboard magazine. The vocal track was recorded 21 December 2011, and production was finished in January 2012 by DJ M.E.G..

Because Lazarev provided the lead vocals for the song, it was included in his album Lazarev.

Music video 
Semko Videos recorded a music video for "Moscow to California" 18 January 2012 in Miami (USA). The music video was directed by Pavel Khudyakov. In America, about 100 people were involved in the filming of the clip. After shooting ten locations in America, a group of actors and a director went to Moscow to shoot some scenes.

The video was presented in the Paradise club in Moscow on 23 February 2012. The music video was released using the World Wide Web on 8 March 2012.

Versions 
Single

Remix

Charts

References

External links 
 
 

2012 singles
2012 songs
Sergey Lazarev songs